Shattered Sea is a young adult fantasy series written by the British author Joe Abercrombie, a trilogy of novels published by Del Rey in the United States and Harper Voyager in the UK.

Novels

Plot
The story follows the exploits of Yarvi, a young prince of Gettland with a disabled hand. When his father dies, Yarvi is elevated to the throne but faces a struggle to keep it as others conspire to take it from him. Initially, the main point of view character, the second book moves to two new characters, Thorn and Brand, while Yarvi remains as a central character. In the third book, three new point of view characters (Princess Skara, the Vansterland warrior Raith and Father Yarvi's apprentice Koll, who features throughout the second book also) are introduced.

Setting
The trilogy is set in what is at first glance an epic fantasy world, but is later shown as a Dying Earth-type post-apocalyptic Scandinavia, seemingly thousands of years in the future. Society has regressed to a medieval-equivalent level after a cataclysm of some kind, and the remnants of past are known as "elf-ruins".

The map of the Shattered Sea tallies closely with that of the current day Baltic Sea, the main three countries of the book, Gettland, Vansterland and Throvenland seem to make up most of what is a modern-day Sweden.

References

External links
 

Fantasy novel trilogies
Young adult novel series